The IMOCA 60 class yacht Banque Populaire VIII was launched on the 9 June 2015, designed by Guillaume Verdier and VPLP and constructed by CDK Technologies in France.

Ownership

Banque Populaire VIII
The boat was commissioned by Banque Populaire Sailing Team for the 2016–2017 Vendée Globe.

Bureau Vallée 2
In 2017 the boat was purchased by Louis Burton and based in St Malo with the intention of competing in the 2020-2021 Vendée Globe

Medalia 2
In May 2021 the boat was purchased by Pip Hare and based in Poole with the intention of competing in the 2024-2025 Vendée Globe.

Racing results

References

External links
 Pip Hare Racing

2010s sailing yachts
Sailing yachts designed by VPLP
Vendée Globe boats
IMOCA 60